The term Treaty of Speyer or Treaty of Spires refers to any of several treaties signed in the city of Speyer (Spires), now in Germany:

Treaty of Speyer (1209)
Treaty of Speyer (1544), or the Peace of Speyer
Treaty of Speyer (1570)

See also
Diet of Speyer
Protestation at Speyer